

Radio Capital is a radio station based in Dhaka, Bangladesh. Bangladeshi journalist Naem Nizam was the founder CEO of this station.

History
Radio Capital was established in November 2015 as a company of East West Media Group a concern of Bashundhara Group. It broadcasts on 94.8 FM. It also broadcasts online.

Commercial Broadcasting from 02.01.2017

Special Capital program
Good Morning Capital
Janen Bhabi
Capital Cocktail
Naat Boltu
Tabiz
Jelas
Capital Theatre

References

2015 establishments in Bangladesh
Organisations based in Dhaka
Radio stations in Bangladesh
Mass media in Dhaka